Japanese submarine I-22 may refer to one of the following submarines of the Imperial Japanese Navy:

 , an  launched in 1926 as I-22 and renamed I-122 in June 1938; sunk in the Sea of Japan by the United States Navy submarine  on 10 June 1945
 , a Type C cruiser submarine; sunk in the Coral Sea in October 1942 by a United States Navy Consolidated PBY Catalina aircraft

Japanese Navy ship names
Imperial Japanese Navy ship names